Autódromo Guadalajara is a motorsport venue located south of Guadalajara, Jalisco, Mexico, near Guadalajara International Airport. The racetrack was opened in 1998.

In the autodrome, "arrancones" races are regularly held on the main straight of the circuit.

References

Guadalajara
Sports venues in Guadalajara, Jalisco